Harold Dawe Cleverdon  (Yatton, 1904Toronto, 1994) was a Canadian Anglican priest in the 20th century.

Harold was educated at the University of Toronto. Ordained in 1935, his first post was a curacy at The Church of the Messiah, Toronto. He held incumbencies at Mulmur, Lakeview and Oshawa. He was Archdeacon of Scarborough from 1956 to 1969.

References

University of Toronto alumni
Archdeacons of Scarborough, ON
20th-century Canadian Anglican priests
1904 births
1994 deaths
People from Somerset